Antonia Scarpa is an American filmmaker and musician born and raised in New York City.

Biography
Scarpa's family immigrated to Brooklyn from the small Sicilian town of Polizzi Generosa, the same town from which Martin Scorsese’s family came. Scarpa founded the alternative rock / performance art / circus act “Naked Sun” directly out of high school.  Moving to Los Angeles, Scarpa played with several of the bands that created the original “Silver Lake” scene.

Scarpa and Moni Ritchie founded the multimedia rock group “The Drummed” (which also featured Rob Campanella of The Quarter After and The Brian Jonestown Massacre and Christian Hejnal of Scarling.) Scarpa played drums, and synthesizers as well as creating a visual projection show for the band's performances.

Scarpa’s dramatic feature “Grace”, the story of a young woman’s battle with terminal illness, premiered at the Cinequest film festival.

Filmography

Discography

Albums and CDs

LPs

Naked Sun, "WONDERDRUG" (1994) — Drums
Naked Sun, "Naked Sun" (1992) — Drums

Singles and EPs
The Drummed, "Eraserhead", EP (1997) — Drums Synth Producer
The Drummed, "Mosquito", EP (1998) — Drums Synth Producer
The Drummed, "The Drummed", EP (1999) — Drums Synth Producer

External links

Official site of Grace

Sources

American film directors
Musicians from New York (state)
American people of Italian descent
Year of birth missing (living people)
Living people